The Statute Law (Repeals) Act 2013 (c. 2) is an Act of the Parliament of the United Kingdom which repealed the whole of 817 Acts of Parliament, and portions of more than 50 others. It is the largest Statute Law (Repeals) Act which has been recommended by the Law Commission.

The enactments repealed included:
 Acts relating to benevolent societies, courts and lotteries that no longer existed (plus the Philanthropic Society, whose successor Catch22 is now regulated by charity law);
 Acts relating to long since reformed aspects of poor law and turnpike trusts;
 Acts regulating London gas lights, which had been replaced with electric lights;
 Acts approving railways which failed to materialize;
 Scottish local taxation acts; which were transferred following Scotland Act 1998
 a provision of Scots law relating to capital punishment, moot since its abolition following Crime and Disorder Act 1998
 the Police Act 1969, which was still in force despite all of its sections having been repealed since 1994
 many Acts relating to territory that was no longer under British sovereignty, including the government of Dublin and railway companies in India.

References

United Kingdom Acts of Parliament 2013